The Circuit de Charade, also known as Circuit Louis Rosier and Circuit Clermont-Ferrand, is a motorsport race track in Saint-Genès-Champanelle near Clermont-Ferrand in the Puy-de-Dôme department in Auvergne in central France. The circuit, built around the base of an extinct volcano, was known for its challenging layout which favored the most skillful drivers and motorcyclists. It hosted the French Grand Prix four times and the French motorcycle Grand Prix ten times.

Circuit history
There had been local interest in motorsport racing beginning with proposals in 1908 for a race on a street circuit, although the proposals were never enacted. Efforts were renewed after the Second World War when the President of the Sports Association of the Automobile Club of Auvergne, Jean Auchatraire, and accomplished racer Louis Rosier designed a course by adapting pre-existing roads around the Puy de Dôme, an extinct volcano which dominated the city skyline. Construction began in May 1957 and the first race was held in July 1958 when an endurance race was won by Innes Ireland in a Lotus 1100, and a Formula Two race won by Maurice Trintignant in a Cooper T43.

With a relentless number of sharp curves and elevation changes and with almost no discernible straights, the circuit was both feared and respected by competitors. The sinuous track layout caused some drivers like Jochen Rindt in the 1969 French Grand Prix to complain of motion sickness, and wore open face helmets just in case. Despite the numerous curves, the track was relatively fast with Chris Amon setting the lap record in a Matra MS120 with a  average during the 1972 French Grand Prix.

In his 1969 book Motor Cycle Racing, Peter Carrick wrote:

The venue first gained international prominence when it hosted the French motorcycle Grand Prix in 1959, won by John Surtees riding an MV Agusta. The circuit would host the French motorcycle Grand Prix ten times between 1959 and 1974. In 1959, Stirling Moss competed on the track for the first time and declared: "I don't know a more wonderful track than Charade". Also in 1959, Ivor Bueb winner of the 1955 24 Hours of Le Mans, died following a crash at the Charade Circuit. The death would mark the only driver fatality at the circuit. The only motorcyclist fatality occurred when Marcelin Herranz was killed on June 1, 1963 during the 250cc race of the French motorcycle Grand Prix.

The 1964 Trophées d'Auvergne Formula 2 race podium was a sign of things to come: Denny Hulme, Jackie Stewart and Jochen Rindt showed their skill before the circuit hosted its first Formula 1 race when Jim Clark won the 1965 French Grand Prix for Team Lotus. In 1965, John Frankenheimer filmed a small part of his movie Grand Prix in front of 3,000 local inhabitants, who posed as race spectators watching actors like Yves Montand and Françoise Hardy. In total four Formula One French Grand Prix were held at Charade, in 1965, 1969, 1970 and 1972.

While the circuit's natural setting created conditions for a sinuous, challenging race course, it also created safety concerns due to the dark, volcanic rocks which fell from the mountain onto both sides of the track. The rocks posed a perennial hazard at the Charade Circuit, as was shown during the 1972 French Grand Prix when ten drivers, including Chris Amon, suffered tire punctures. Drivers who skirted the track edge would send rocks flying in the middle of the road and into the path of pursuing competitors. One particular incident at the 1972 French Grand Prix involved Helmut Marko trailing behind Emerson Fittipaldi, when a stone thrown from Fittipaldi's Lotus penetrated Marko's helmet visor, cutting his racing career short as his left eye was subsequently blinded. The mountainous topography also left no room to provide safe run-off areas in the event of competitors losing control of their vehicles and unintentionally leaving the race course.

The venue became increasingly shunned by international racing series as concerns about the public roads' dangerous nature rose. In 1971, the newly built and much safer Circuit Paul Ricard held the French Grand Prix for the first time, before becoming the event's permanent home from 1973 to 1990, alternating the French Grand Prix with the Circuit Dijon-Prenois. It continued to host smaller motorsports competitions such as Formula 3, sports car racing, touring car racing, rallying and hillclimbing as well as the Trophées d'Auverne. In 1980, three track marshals were killed at a touring car race, and in 1984 there was a drivers protest over track safety. Faced with increasing safety issues and with the natural topography preventing any chance of adding run-off areas, the final race on the original  track was held on September 18, 1988.

Modernization 

The General Council of Puy-de-Dôme recognized the importance of the race track to the local economy and financed the building of a new  circuit utilising only the southern portion of the original, with a new link road completing the circuit. The new Circuit de Charade opened in 1989 hosting national championship races in the 1994 French Supertouring Championship and the 1998 FFSA GT Championship.

Currently, the venue holds events such as track days, driving courses as well as historic motorsport events. In 2000, the roads were closed to the public, with the track becoming a truly permanent facility with new pit garages and a widened pit lane. The original sections of the  street circuit are still in use as public roadways.

Lap records 

The official race lap records at the Circuit de Charade are listed as:

Notes

References

External links 
 Official site 
 Official association site to save circuit 

 Satellite picture by Google Maps (present layout; zoom out to see the old circuit)

Formula One circuits
Grand Prix motorcycle circuits
Charade
Sports venues in Puy-de-Dôme
French Grand Prix
Trophées d’Auvergne
Sports venues completed in 1958